Flexible scheduling or flex scheduling may refer to:

 Modular scheduling in American schools
 Flexible scheduling in the National Football League
Flexible schedules may refer to:
 Flextime